Route 253 is a north/south highway on the south shore of the St. Lawrence River. Its northern terminus is in East Angus at Route 112 and its southern terminus is at the Vermont border, where it becomes Vermont Route 253.

Municipalities along Route 253
 East Hereford
 Saint-Venant-de-Paquette
 Saint-Malo
 Saint-Isidore-de-Clifton
 Cookshire-Eaton
 Westbury
 East Angus

See also
 List of Quebec provincial highways

References

External links 
 Route 253 on Google Maps
 Provincial Route Map (Courtesy of the Quebec Ministry of Transportation) 

253